Tiril Udnes Weng (born 29 September 1996) is a Norwegian cross-country skier.

Career
At the 2014, 2015 and 2016 Junior World Championships she won two bronze medals (one in relay), one silver and one gold medal (both in relay). As an U23 junior she competed at the 2017, 2018 and 2019 Junior World Championships, bagging one bronze, two silver and one gold medal, all in individual races.

She made her World Cup debut in March 2015 in Drammen, and collected her first World Cup points in January 2017 in Toblach with a 21st place in the sprint. She broke the top 20 for the first time in January 2018 in Seefeld, finishing 11th, following up with a 9th place in March in Drammen. In February 2019 in Lahti she reached the sprint final for the first time, finishing 6th. She also made her World Championships debut in 2019, finishing 15th in the sprint.

Weng represents the sports club Nes Ski. She is the twin sister of Lotta Udnes Weng and a third cousin of Heidi Weng.

Cross-country skiing results
All results are sourced from the International Ski Federation (FIS).

Olympic Games

World Championships
 3 medals – (2 gold, 1 silver)

World Cup

Season standings

Individual podiums
 1 victory – (1 ) 
 10 podiums – (7 , 3 )

Team podiums
 2 victories – (2 ) 
 5 podiums – (3 , 2 )

References

External links
 
 

1996 births
Living people
People from Nes, Akershus
Norwegian female cross-country skiers
Tour de Ski skiers
Twin sportspeople
Norwegian twins
FIS Nordic World Ski Championships medalists in cross-country skiing
Cross-country skiers at the 2022 Winter Olympics
Olympic cross-country skiers of Norway
Sportspeople from Viken (county)